Dignity plc is a funeral-related service provider in the United Kingdom, and the only publicly listed company within the country's funeral sector.

History
The business was created in 1994 through the merger of Plantsbrook Group and Great Southern Group, both of which companies had been acquired by Service Corporation International Inc earlier that year. In 2002 the merged business was the subject of a management buyout from Service Corporation International Inc. The merger brought together a number of funeral service businesses.

Dignity is an established organisation, with an extensive history that dates back to 1812. Its rich and lengthy heritage enables it to provide funeral services that are underpinned by unparalleled local knowledge and expertise.

There are currently 795 Dignity Funeral Directors across the UK. Several mergers and organic growth have brought together a number of historic funeral businesses, private cemeteries and crematoria over the years, including:

 George S Munn, Glasgow – 1812
 Francis Chappell & Sons, London – 1840
 J Rymer, York – 1848
 Ginns & Gutteridge, Leicestershire – 1855
 Lawrence Funeral Service, Halifax – 1857
 E Finch & Sons, Aldershot – 1857
 Beckenham Cemetery, Kent – 1876
 J H Kenyon, London – 1880
 Frederick W Paine, London – 1884
 Perry Barr Crematorium, Birmingham – 1903
 John Bardgett & Son, Newcastle upon Tyne – 1914
 Jonathan Harvey, Glasgow – 1928
 South London Crematorium – 1930
 Seaford & Newhaven Funeral Service, East Sussex – 1950

In January 2023, the board agreed to accept an offer for the company from a consortium of investors including SPWOne V Ltd, Castelnau Group and Phoenix Asset Management.

Operations
Dignity provides funeral services, cremations and pre-arranged funerals UK-wide through three separate brands:

 Dignity Funeral Services
 The Crematorium and Memorial Group
 Simplicity Cremations

References

External links
Official site
Dignity Funeral Plans
Simplicity Cremations

Funeral-related companies of the United Kingdom
British companies established in 1994
Companies listed on the London Stock Exchange
Companies based in Birmingham, West Midlands